Unnamed Memory is a Japanese light novel series by Kuji Furumiya. It originated from the novel posting website Shōsetsuka ni Narō in September 2012. It was later acquired by ASCII Media Works, who published the series with illustrations by Chibi under their Dengeki no Shin Bungei imprint. The series was published in six volumes, released from January 2019 to April 2021. A manga adaptation with illustrations by Naoki Koshimizu began serialization in ASCII Media Works' Dengeki Daioh magazine in September 2020. As of January 2023, it has been published in four tankōbon volumes. An anime television series adaptation produced by ENGI is set to premiere in 2023.

Characters

Media

Light novels
The series was written by Kuji Furumiya. It started as a web novel published on the Shōsetsuka ni Narō novel website in September 2012. It was later acquired by ASCII Media Works, who published the series with illustrations by Chibi under its Dengeki no Shin Bungei imprint.  The first volume was released on January 17, 2019. The sixth and final volume was released on April 17, 2021.

In July 2020, Yen Press announced they licensed the series for English publication.

A sequel series titled Unnamed Memory: After the End began publication on February 17, 2022.

Volume list

After the End

Manga
A manga adaptation, illustrated by Naoki Koshimizu, began serialization in ASCII Media Works' Dengeki Daioh magazine on September 26, 2020. As of January 2023, the individual chapters have been collected into four tankōbon volumes. The manga is also licensed by Yen Press.

Volume list

Anime
An anime television series adaptation was announced on December 13, 2022. It is produced by ENGI and directed by Kazuya Miura, with scripts written by Deko Akao, character designs handled by Chika Nōmi, and music composed by Akito Matsuda. The series is set to premiere in 2023.

Reception
Rebecca Silverman from Anime News Network praised the ending of the first volume and its illustrations, while also criticizing the start. Demelza from Anime UK News had similar feelings, while also praising the characters.

In the Kono Light Novel ga Sugoi! guidebook, the series ranked first in the tankōbon category in 2020.

References

External links
  at Shōsetsuka ni Narō 
  
  
 

2019 Japanese novels
2022 Japanese novels
2023 anime television series debuts
Anime and manga based on light novels
ASCII Media Works manga
Dengeki Daioh
ENGI
Fantasy anime and manga
Japanese fantasy novels
Light novels
Light novels first published online
Shōnen manga
Shōsetsuka ni Narō
Upcoming anime television series
Yen Press titles